Mousseaux-sur-Seine (literally Mousseaux on Seine) is a commune in the Yvelines department in the Île-de-France region in north-central France.

Geography
Mousseaux-sur-Seine is a riverside town in the Seine, situated 14 km west of Mantes-la-Jolie and 6 km east of Bonnières-sur-Seine, on the Left Bank, in the loop Moisson. It borders of Freneuse Mericourt and west, north Moisson. To the east, it is separated by the Seine Saint-Martin-la-Garenne.

The village is located by the river along a limestone cliff where many were dug basements, "boves" which once served homes.

Seine borders the town to the southeast.
Sablière of loops of the Seine Moisson-Mousseaux.

History
This territory was already inhabited in the Neolithic period. Numerous flint weapons have been found.
In pre-Roman Gaul the Belgic tribe of the Veliocasses or Velocasses controlled a large area around the town.
Christianity came to the area with the work of Nicasius of Rouen, about 250AD

The village of Mousseaux is a center of caving in the area.  The inhabitants of the area have nicknamed the caves "sparkling".

The village was until the late 18th century an important wine production, which remains, still visible, an old press.
In 2003, Mousseaux-sur-Seine chooses to join the urban community of Mantes en Yvelines, rather than the community of communes des Portes Île-de-France focused on Bonnières-sur-Seine.

Landmarks
Saint-Léger church stone church Gothic Revival limestone dating from 1875. 
winepress: kept in a "bove" excavation dug into the limestone cliff.
Painting workshop of Martine Darcel
the Town Hall
 recreation Park on the river popular with Parisians

Population

In 1793 the population was 631 persons and by 1800 had dropped to 627. This began a steady decline through the 19th century until 1900 when the population was about 170 and had reached 136 by the eve of World War II. After the war the population grew until today it has reached its pre-revolution numbers. In 2017, the municipality had 682 inhabitants.

See also
Communes of the Yvelines department

References

Communes of Yvelines